The 1998 Eastbourne Borough Council election took place on 7 May 1998 to elect members of Eastbourne Borough Council in East Sussex, England. One third of the council was up for election and the Liberal Democrats stayed in overall control of the council.

After the election, the composition of the council was:
Liberal Democrats 18
Conservative 12

Election result
2 seats were contested in Langney and Roselands wards after the resignation of the councillors Lesley Morris and John Ungar respectively. Overall turnout at the election was 31.77%, down from 36.35% in 1996.

Ward results

By-elections between 1998 and 1999
A by-election was held on 3 September 1998 in Ratton ward after the resignation of Scott Stevens. Conservative Barbara Goodall gained the seat from the Liberal Democrats.

References

1998
1998 English local elections
1990s in East Sussex